Chicksands is a village and former civil parish, now in the parish of Campton and Chicksands in the Central Bedfordshire district of Bedfordshire, England. The village is on the River Flit and close to its parish village of Campton and the town of Shefford. 

In 1961 the parish had a population of 607.  In 2007, the population was estimated to be 2,510. By the 2011 census the figure was 1,699.  

Mid Bedfordshire District Council moved to a new office building on a part of the former RAF Chicksands sportsfield, adjacent to the A507, having previously been based in offices at Ampthill and Biggleswade. The new office, named Priory House, was officially opened by the Queen on 17 November 2006 accompanied by the Duke of Edinburgh. The offices are now home to Central Bedfordshire Council.

History 
Chicksands is mentioned in the Domesday Book the entry reads: Chichesana/e: William de Cairon from Bishop of Lincoln; Three freemen and Walter from Azelina, Ralph Tailbois' wife (it is of her dowry). Mill.

Chicksands was the site of RAF Chicksands, an RAF station during World War II. The station was used by the United States Air Force from 1950 to 1995. It was the location for its first huge FLR-9 direction finding antenna from 1963 to 1995. The antenna was known as the 'Elephant Cage' and was dismantled before the USAF left in 1995. It is now home to the Joint Intelligence Training Group (JITG) and the Headquarters of the British Army's Intelligence Corps.

Chicksands Priory, a monastic house built in 1150, is located within the grounds of the Joint Intelligence Training Group. It is open to the public, by appointment only, on the 1st & 3rd Sunday afternoons, April–October.
Chicksands Priory was formerly an extra-parochial tract, from 1858 Chicksands Priory was a civil parish in its own right, it was later renamed to just "Chicksands", on 1 April 1985 the parish was abolished and merged with Campton to form "Campton & Chicksands".

References

External links 

 Campton & Chicksands
 Chicksands Offices – Mid Beds District Council
 Chicksands History
 Friends of Chicksands Prioy Website

Villages in Bedfordshire
Former civil parishes in Bedfordshire
Central Bedfordshire District